Thomas Edward Fitzpatrick (April 24, 1930 – September 14, 2009), nicknamed Tommy Fitz, was an American pilot known for two intoxicated flights where he flew from New Jersey and landed on the streets of New York City.

Flights
While intoxicated, Fitzpatrick, a resident of Emerson, New Jersey, stole a single-engine plane from the Teterboro School of Aeronautics at Teterboro Airport in New Jersey at approximately 3 a.m. on September 30, 1956, and flew without lights or radio before landing on St. Nicholas Avenue near 191st Street in front of a New York City bar where earlier he had been drinking and made an intoxicated barroom bet that he could travel from New Jersey to New York City in 15 minutes. The New York Times called the flight a "feat of aeronautics" and a "fine landing". For his illegal flight, he was fined $100 after the plane's owner refused to press charges.

On October 4, 1958, just before 1 a.m., Fitzpatrick, again intoxicated, stole another plane from the same airfield and landed on Amsterdam and 187th street in front of a Yeshiva University building after another bar patron disbelieved his first feat. For his second stolen flight, Judge John A. Mullen sentenced him to six months in prison, stating, "Had you been properly jolted then, it's possible this would not have occurred a second time." Fitzpatrick said "it's the lousy drink" that caused him to attempt the stunt.

Local resident Jim Clarke believed that Fitzpatrick's goal was to land on the field of George Washington High School.

Personal life
Fitzpatrick worked as a steamfitter with UA Local #638 of New York City for 51 years. According to Fitzpatrick's brother, Fitzpatrick lied about his age in order to serve in World War II and joined the US Marine Corps at the age of 15, fighting in China. Before being discharged from the Marines two years after World War II, Fitzpatrick learned to fly a reconnaissance plane. He then joined the US Army and was stationed in Japan. He was scheduled to return home when the Korean War began. Fitzpatrick became the first person from New York City to be wounded in Korea. According to one report, "he was wounded while driving an ammunition truck to rescue some American soldiers trapped by Communist fire". He received a Purple Heart for his service. He was a member of the Township of Washington Golden Seniors, Our Lady of Good Counsel Men's Group, VFW Post # 6192 of Washington Township and the China-Marines Organization.

Death
A resident of Washington Township, Bergen County, New Jersey, Fitzpatrick died of cancer on September 14, 2009, at the age of 79. He was survived by his three sons, Thomas E. Jr, Daniel F., and Stephen P. Fitzpatrick, and his wife of 51 years, Helen (Fratinardo) Fitzpatrick.

Legacy
Fitzpatrick has a mixed drink named after him for his feat called the "Late Night Flight".

References

1930 births
2009 deaths
American aviators
People from Washington Heights, Manhattan
People from Washington Township, Bergen County, New Jersey
People from Emerson, New Jersey
Military personnel from New York City
United States Marine Corps personnel of World War II
United States Army personnel of the Korean War
Child soldiers in World War II
Deaths from cancer in New Jersey